Kannon-ji (Kannon Temple) (Japanese: 観音寺) is a Koyasan Shingon temple in Tokushima, Tokushima Prefecture, Japan. It is Temple # 16 on the Shikoku 88 temple pilgrimage. The main image is of Senju Kannon (Guan Yin Boddhisattva, Sanskrit: Avalokitasvara or Avalokiteśvara).

History
The temple was constructed during Emperor Shōmu's reign (701–756) as an imperial pilgrimage place.  During the Tenshō (天正) era (1573–1592), the temple was destroyed by the forces of Chōsokabe Motochika (長宗我部 元親).  In the Manji (万治) era (1658–1661), the temple was rebuilt with the support of the Hachisuka clan (蜂須賀氏).

See also
 Shikoku 88 temple pilgrimage

References

 四国八十八箇所霊場会 編 『先達教典』 2006年
 宮崎建樹 著 『四国遍路ひとり歩き同行二人』地図編 へんろみち保存協力会 2007年（第8版）

External links
 第16番札所 光耀山 千手院 観音寺（四国八十八ヶ所霊場会公式）
 第16番札所・観音寺（徳島市）

Buddhist pilgrimage sites in Japan
Buddhist temples in Tokushima Prefecture
Kōyasan Shingon temples